Enteromius teugelsi is a species of ray-finned fish in the genus Enteromius. It's distribution is the Little Scarcies River basin in Guinea.

References 

Enteromius
Taxa named by Mamadou Bamba
Taxa named by Emmanuel J. Vreven
Taxa named by Jos Snoeks
Fish described in 2011